Raspberry Pi is a series of small single-board computers (SBCs) developed in the United Kingdom by the Raspberry Pi Foundation in association with Broadcom. The Raspberry Pi project originally leaned towards the promotion of teaching basic computer science in schools and in developing countries. The original model became more popular than anticipated, selling outside its target market for uses such as robotics. It is widely used in many areas, such as for weather monitoring, because of its low cost, modularity, and open design. It is typically used by computer and electronic hobbyists, due to its adoption of the HDMI and USB standards.

After the release of the second board type, the Raspberry Pi Foundation set up a new entity, named Raspberry Pi Trading, and installed Eben Upton as CEO, with the responsibility of developing technology. The Foundation was rededicated as an educational charity for promoting the teaching of basic computer science in schools and developing countries. Most Pis are made in a Sony factory in Pencoed, Wales, while others are made in China and Japan.

In 2015 the Raspberry Pi surpassed the ZX Spectrum in unit sales, becoming the best selling British computer.

Series and generations 

There are three series of Raspberry Pi, and several generations of each have been released. Raspberry Pi SBCs feature a Broadcom system on a chip (SoC) with an integrated ARM-compatible central processing unit (CPU) and on-chip graphics processing unit (GPU), while Raspberry Pi Pico has a RP2040 system on chip with an integrated ARM-compatible central processing unit (CPU).

Raspberry Pi
 The first-generation Raspberry Pi Model B was released in February 2012, followed by the simpler and cheaper Model A.
 In 2014, the Foundation released a board with an improved design, Raspberry Pi Model B+. These first-generation boards feature ARM11 processors, are approximately credit-card sized, and represent the standard mainline form factor. Improved A+ and B models were released within a year. A "Compute Module" was released in April 2014 for embedded applications.

 The Raspberry Pi 2 was released in February 2015 and initially featured a 900 MHz 32-bit quad-core ARM Cortex-A7 processor with 1 GB RAM. Revision 1.2 featured a 900 MHz 64-bit quad-core ARM Cortex-A53 processor (the same as that in the Raspberry Pi 3 Model B, but underclocked to 900 MHz).

 The Raspberry Pi 3 Model B was released in February 2016 with a 1.2 GHz 64-bit quad core ARM Cortex-A53 processor, on-board 802.11n Wi-Fi, Bluetooth and USB boot capabilities.
 On Pi Day 2018, the Raspberry Pi 3 Model B+ was launched with a faster 1.4 GHz processor, a three-times faster Gigabit Ethernet (throughput limited to ca. 300 Mbit/s by the internal USB 2.0 connection), and 2.4 / 5 GHz dual-band 802.11ac Wi-Fi (100 Mbit/s). Other features are Power over Ethernet (PoE) (with the add-on PoE HAT), USB boot and network boot (an SD card is no longer required).

 The Raspberry Pi 4 Model B was released in June 2019 with a 1.5 GHz 64-bit quad core ARM Cortex-A72 processor, on-board 802.11ac Wi-Fi, Bluetooth 5, full gigabit Ethernet (throughput not limited), two USB 2.0 ports, two USB 3.0 ports, 1–8 GB of RAM, and dual-monitor support via a pair of micro HDMI (HDMI Type D) ports for up to 4K resolution. The version with 1 GB RAM has been abandoned and the prices of the 2 GB version have been reduced. The 8 GB version has a revised circuit board. The Pi 4 is also powered via a USB-C port, enabling additional power to be provided to downstream peripherals, when used with an appropriate PSU. But the Pi can only be operated with 5 volts and not 9 or 12 volts like other mini computers of this class. The initial Raspberry Pi 4 board has a design flaw where third-party e-marked USB cables, such as those used on Apple MacBooks, incorrectly identify it and refuse to provide power. Tom's Hardware tested 14 different cables and found that 11 of them turned on and powered the Pi without issue. The design flaw was fixed in revision 1.2 of the board, released in late 2019. In mid-2021, Pi 4 B models appeared with the improved Broadcom BCM2711C0. The manufacturer is now using this chip for the Pi 4 B and Pi 400. However, the clock frequency of the Pi 4 B was not increased in the factory.

 The Raspberry Pi 400 was released in November 2020. A modern example of a keyboard computer, it features 4 GB of LPDDR4 RAM on a custom board derived from the existing Raspberry Pi 4 combined with a keyboard in a single case. The case was derived from that of the Raspberry Pi Keyboard. A robust cooling solution (i.e. a broad metal plate) and an upgraded switched-mode power supply allow the Raspberry Pi 400's Broadcom BCM2711C0 processor to be clocked at 1.8 GHz, which is 20% faster than the Raspberry Pi 4 upon which it is based.

Raspberry Pi Zero
 A Raspberry Pi Zero with smaller size and reduced input/output (I/O) and general-purpose input/output (GPIO) capabilities was released in November 2015 for US$5.
 On 16 May 2016, the Raspberry Pi Zero v1.3 was released, which added a camera connector.
 On 28 February 2017, the Raspberry Pi Zero W was launched, a version of the Zero with Wi-Fi and Bluetooth capabilities, for US$10.
 On 12 January 2018, the Raspberry Pi Zero WH was launched, a version of the Zero W with pre-soldered GPIO headers.
 On 28 October 2021, the Raspberry Pi Zero 2 W was launched, a version of the Zero W with a system in a package (SiP) designed by Raspberry Pi and based on the Raspberry Pi 3. In contrast to the older Zero models, the Pi Zero 2 W is 64-bit capable. The price is around US$15.

Raspberry Pi Pico
 Raspberry Pi Pico was released in January 2021 with a retail price of $4. It was Raspberry Pi's first board based upon a single microcontroller chip; the RP2040, which was designed by Raspberry Pi in the UK. The Pico has 264 KB of RAM and 2 MB of flash memory. It is programmable in C, C++, Assembly, MicroPython, CircuitPython and Rust. The Raspberry Pi Foundation has partnered with Adafruit, Pimoroni, Arduino and SparkFun to build accessories for Raspberry Pi Pico and variety of other boards using RP2040 Silicon Platform. Rather than perform the role of general purpose computer (like the others in the range) it is designed for physical computing, similar in concept to an Arduino.
 On 30 June 2022, the Raspberry Pi Pico W was launched, a version of the Pico with 802.11n Wi-Fi capability, for US$6. The CYW43439 wireless chip in the Pico W also supports Bluetooth, but the capability was not enabled at launch.

Model comparison

As of 4 May 2021, the Foundation is committed to manufacture most Pi models until at least January 2026. Even the 1 GB Pi 4B can still be specially-ordered.

Hardware 
The Raspberry Pi hardware has evolved through several versions that feature variations in the type of the central processing unit, amount of memory capacity, networking support, and peripheral-device support.

This block diagram describes models B, B+, A and A+. The Pi Zero models are similar, but lack the Ethernet and USB hub components. The Ethernet adapter is internally connected to an additional USB port. In Model A, A+, and the Pi Zero, the USB port is connected directly to the system on a chip (SoC). On the Pi 1 Model B+ and later models the USB/Ethernet chip contains a five-port USB hub, of which four ports are available, while the Pi 1 Model B only provides two. On the Pi Zero, the USB port is also connected directly to the SoC, but it uses a micro USB (OTG) port. Unlike all other Pi models, the 40 pin GPIO connector is omitted on the Pi Zero, with solderable through-holes only in the pin locations. The Pi Zero WH remedies this.

Processor speed ranges from 700 MHz to 1.4 GHz for the Pi 3 Model B+ or 1.5 GHz for the Pi 4; on-board memory ranges from 256 MB to 8 GB random-access memory (RAM), with only the Raspberry Pi 4 having more than 1 GB. Secure Digital (SD) cards in MicroSDHC form factor (SDHC on early models) are used to store the operating system and program memory, however some models also come with onboard eMMC storage and the Raspberry Pi 4 can also make use of USB-attached SSD storage for its operating system. The boards have one to five USB ports. For video output, HDMI and composite video are supported, with a standard 3.5 mm tip-ring-sleeve jack carrying mono audio together with composite video. Lower-level output is provided by a number of GPIO pins, which support common protocols like I²C. The B-models have an 8P8C Ethernet port and the Pi 3, Pi 4 and Pi Zero W have on-board Wi-Fi 802.11n and Bluetooth.

Processor 

The Broadcom BCM2835 SoC used in the first generation Raspberry Pi includes a 700 MHz 32-bit ARM1176JZF-S processor, VideoCore IV graphics processing unit (GPU), and RAM. It has a level 1 (L1) cache of 16 KB and a level 2 (L2) cache of 128 KB. The level 2 cache is used primarily by the GPU. The SoC is stacked underneath the RAM chip, so only its edge is visible. The ARM1176JZ(F)-S is the same CPU used in the original iPhone, although at a higher clock rate, and mated with a much faster GPU.

The earlier V1.1 model of the Raspberry Pi 2 used a Broadcom BCM2836 SoC with a 900 MHz 32-bit, quad-core ARM Cortex-A7 processor, with 256 KB shared L2 cache. The Raspberry Pi 2 V1.2 was upgraded to a Broadcom BCM2837 SoC with a 1.2 GHz 64-bit quad-core ARM Cortex-A53 processor, the same one which is used on the Raspberry Pi 3, but underclocked (by default) to the same 900 MHz CPU clock speed as the V1.1. The BCM2836 SoC is no longer in production as of late 2016.

The Raspberry Pi 3 Model B uses a Broadcom BCM2837 SoC with a 1.2 GHz 64-bit quad-core ARM Cortex-A53 processor, with 512 KB shared L2 cache. The Model A+ and B+ are 1.4 GHz

The Raspberry Pi 4 uses a Broadcom BCM2711 SoC with a 1.5 GHz (later models: 1.8 GHz) 64-bit quad-core ARM Cortex-A72 processor, with 1 MB shared L2 cache. Unlike previous models, which all used a custom interrupt controller poorly suited for virtualisation, the interrupt controller on this SoC is compatible with the ARM Generic Interrupt Controller (GIC) architecture 2.0, providing hardware support for interrupt distribution when using ARM virtualisation capabilities.

The Raspberry Pi Zero and Zero W use the same Broadcom BCM2835 SoC as the first generation Raspberry Pi, although now running at 1 GHz CPU clock speed.

The Raspberry Pi Zero W 2 uses the RP3A0-AU CPU, a 1 GHz 64 bit ARM Cortex A53, on 512MB of SDRAM. Documentation states this "system-on-package" is a Broadcom BCM2710A1 package, using a BCM2837 Broadcom chip as core, which is an ARM v8 quad-core. The Raspberry Pi 3 also uses the BCM2837, but clocked at 1.2 GHz.

The Raspberry Pi Pico uses the RP2040 running at 133 MHz.

Performance 
While operating at 700 MHz by default, the first generation Raspberry Pi provided a real-world performance roughly equivalent to 0.041 GFLOPS. On the CPU level the performance is similar to a 300 MHz Pentium II of 1997–99. The GPU provides 1 Gpixel/s or 1.5 Gtexel/s of graphics processing or 24 GFLOPS of general purpose computing performance. The graphical capabilities of the Raspberry Pi are roughly equivalent to the performance of the Xbox of 2001.

Raspberry Pi 2 V1.1 included a quad-core Cortex-A7 CPU running at 900 MHz and 1 GB RAM. It was described as 4–6 times more powerful than its predecessor. The GPU was identical to the original. In parallelised benchmarks, the Raspberry Pi 2 V1.1 could be up to 14 times faster than a Raspberry Pi 1 Model B+.

The Raspberry Pi 3, with a quad-core Cortex-A53 processor, is described as having ten times the performance of a Raspberry Pi 1. Benchmarks showed the Raspberry Pi 3 to be approximately 80% faster than the Raspberry Pi 2 in parallelised tasks.

The Raspberry Pi 4, with a quad-core Cortex-A72 processor, is described as having three times the performance of a Raspberry Pi 3.

Overclocking 
Most Raspberry Pi systems-on-chip could be overclocked to 800 MHz, and some to 1000 MHz. There are reports the Raspberry Pi 2 can be similarly overclocked, in extreme cases, even to 1500 MHz (discarding all safety features and over-voltage limitations). In Raspberry Pi OS the overclocking options on boot can be made by a software command running "sudo raspi-config" without voiding the warranty. In those cases the Pi automatically shuts the overclocking down if the chip temperature reaches , but it is possible to override automatic over-voltage and overclocking settings (voiding the warranty); an appropriately sized heat sink is needed to protect the chip from serious overheating.

Newer versions of the firmware contain the option to choose between five overclock ("turbo") presets that, when used, attempt to maximise the performance of the SoC without impairing the lifetime of the board. This is done by monitoring the core temperature of the chip and the CPU load, and dynamically adjusting clock speeds and the core voltage. When the demand is low on the CPU or it is running too hot, the performance is throttled, but if the CPU has much to do and the chip's temperature is acceptable, performance is temporarily increased with clock speeds of up to 1 GHz, depending on the board version and on which of the turbo settings is used.

The overclocking modes are:

In the highest (turbo) mode the SDRAM clock speed was originally 500 MHz, but this was later changed to 600 MHz because of occasional SD card corruption. Simultaneously, in high mode the core clock speed was lowered from 450 to 250 MHz, and in medium mode from 333 to 250 MHz.

The CPU of the first and second generation Raspberry Pi board did not require cooling with a heat sink or fan, even when overclocked, but the Raspberry Pi 3 may generate more heat when overclocked.

RAM 
The early designs of the Raspberry Pi Model A and B boards included only 256 MB of random access memory (RAM). Of this, the early beta Model B boards allocated 128 MB to the GPU by default, leaving only 128 MB for the CPU. On the early 256 MB releases of models A and B, three different splits were possible. The default split was 192 MB for the CPU, which should be sufficient for standalone 1080p video decoding, or for simple 3D processing. 224 MB was for Linux processing only, with only a 1080p framebuffer, and was likely to fail for any video or 3D. 128 MB was for heavy 3D processing, possibly also with video decoding. In comparison, the Nokia 701 uses 128 MB for the Broadcom VideoCore IV.

The later Model B with 512 MB RAM, was released on 15 October 2012 and was initially released with new standard memory split files (arm256_start.elf, arm384_start.elf, arm496_start.elf) with 256 MB, 384 MB, and 496 MB CPU RAM, and with 256 MB, 128 MB, and 16 MB video RAM, respectively. But about one week later, the foundation released a new version of start.elf that could read a new entry in config.txt (gpu_mem=xx) and could dynamically assign an amount of RAM (from 16 to 256 MB in 8 MB steps) to the GPU, obsoleting the older method of splitting memory, and a single start.elf worked the same for 256 MB and 512 MB Raspberry Pis.

The Raspberry Pi 2 has 1 GB of RAM.

The Raspberry Pi 3 has 1 GB of RAM in the B and B+ models, and 512 MB of RAM in the A+ model. The Raspberry Pi Zero and Zero W have 512 MB of RAM.

The Raspberry Pi 4 is available with 1, 2, 4 or 8 GB of RAM. A 1 GB model was originally available at launch in June 2019 but was discontinued in March 2020, and the 8 GB model was introduced in May 2020. The 1 GB model returned in October 2021.

Networking 
The Model A, A+ and Pi Zero have no Ethernet circuitry and are commonly connected to a network using an external user-supplied USB Ethernet or Wi-Fi adapter. On the  the Ethernet port is provided by a built-in USB Ethernet adapter using the SMSC LAN9514 chip. The Raspberry Pi 3 and Pi Zero W (wireless) are equipped with 2.4 GHz WiFi 802.11n  and Bluetooth 4.1  based on the Broadcom BCM43438 FullMAC chip with no official support for monitor mode (though it was implemented through unofficial firmware patching) and the Pi 3 also has a 10/100 Mbit/s Ethernet port. The Raspberry Pi 3B+ features dual-band IEEE 802.11b/g/n/ac WiFi, Bluetooth 4.2, and Gigabit Ethernet (limited to approximately 300 Mbit/s by the USB 2.0 bus between it and the SoC). The Raspberry Pi 4 has full gigabit Ethernet (throughput is not limited as it is not funnelled via the USB chip.)

Special-purpose features 
The RPi Zero, RPi1A, RPi3A+ and RPi4 can be used as a USB device or "USB gadget", plugged into another computer via a USB port on another machine. It can be configured in multiple ways, such as functioning as a serial or Ethernet device. Although originally requiring software patches, this was added into the mainline Raspbian distribution in May 2016.

Raspberry Pi models with a newer chipset can boot from USB mass storage, such as from a flash drive. Booting from USB mass storage is not available in the original Raspberry Pi models, the Raspberry Pi Zero, the Raspberry Pi Pico, the Raspberry Pi 2 A models, and the Raspberry Pi 2 B models with versions lower than 1.2.

Peripherals 

Although often pre-configured to operate as a headless computer, the Raspberry Pi may also optionally be operated with any generic USB computer keyboard and mouse. It may also be used with USB storage, USB to MIDI converters, and virtually any other device/component with USB capabilities, depending on the installed device drivers in the underlying operating system (many of which are included by default).

Other peripherals can be attached through the various pins and connectors on the surface of the Raspberry Pi.

Video 

The video controller can generate standard modern TV resolutions, such as HD and Full HD, and higher or lower monitor resolutions as well as older NTSC or PAL standard CRT TV resolutions. As shipped (i.e., without custom overclocking) it can support the following resolutions: 640×350 EGA; 640×480 VGA; 800×600 SVGA; 1024×768 XGA; 1280×720 720p HDTV; 1280×768 WXGA variant; 1280×800 WXGA variant; 1280×1024 SXGA; 1366×768 WXGA variant; 1400×1050 SXGA+; 1600×1200 UXGA; 1680×1050 WXGA+; 1920×1080 1080p HDTV; 1920×1200 WUXGA.

Higher resolutions, up to 2048×1152, may work or even 3840×2160 at 15 Hz (too low a frame rate for convincing video). Allowing the highest resolutions does not imply that the GPU can decode video formats at these resolutions; in fact, the Raspberry Pis are known to not work reliably for H.265 (at those high resolutions), commonly used for very high resolutions (however, most common formats up to Full HD do work).

Although the Raspberry Pi 3 does not have H.265 decoding hardware, the CPU is more powerful than its predecessors, potentially fast enough to allow the decoding of H.265-encoded videos in software. The GPU in the Raspberry Pi 3 runs at higher clock frequencies of 300 MHz or 400 MHz, compared to previous versions which ran at 250 MHz.

The Raspberry Pis can also generate 576i and 480i composite video signals, as used on old-style (CRT) TV screens and less-expensive monitors through standard connectorseither RCA or 3.5 mm phono connector depending on model. The television signal standards supported are PAL-B/G/H/I/D, PAL-M, PAL-N, NTSC and NTSC-J.

Real-time clock 
When booting, the time defaults to being set over the network using the Network Time Protocol (NTP). The source of time information can be another computer on the local network that does have a real-time clock, or to a NTP server on the internet. If no network connection is available, the time may be set manually or configured to assume that no time passed during the shutdown. In the latter case, the time is monotonic (files saved later in time always have later timestamps) but may be considerably earlier than the actual time. For systems that require a built-in real-time clock, a number of small, low-cost add-on boards with real-time clocks are available.

The RP2040 microcontroller has a built-in real-time clock but this can not be set automatically without some form of user entry or network facility being added.

Connectors 
 Pi Pico 

 Pi Compute Module 

 Pi Zero 

 Model A 

 Model B

J8 header and general purpose input-output (GPIO) 
Raspberry Pi 1 Models A+ and B+, Pi 2 Model B, Pi 3 Models A+, B and B+, Pi 4, and Pi Zero, Zero W, Zero WH and Zero W 2 have the same 40-pin pinout called J8 header. Raspberry Pi 1 Models A and B have only the first 26 pins. The J8 header is commonly referred to as GPIO connector as a whole even though only a subset of the pins are GPIO pins. In the Pi Zero and Zero W, the 40 GPIO pins are unpopulated, having the through-holes exposed for soldering instead. The Zero WH (Wireless + Header) has the header pins preinstalled.

Model B rev. 2 also has a pad (called P5 on the board and P6 on the schematics) of 8 pins offering access to an additional 4 GPIO connections. These GPIO pins were freed when the four board version identification links present in revision 1.0 were removed.

Models A and B provide GPIO access to the ACT status LED using GPIO 16. Models A+ and B+ provide GPIO access to the ACT status LED using GPIO 47, and the power status LED using GPIO 35.

Specifications

Simplified Model B changelog

Software

Operating systems 

The Raspberry Pi Foundation provides Raspberry Pi OS (formerly called Raspbian), a Debian-based Linux distribution for download, as well as third-party Ubuntu, Windows 10 IoT Core, RISC OS, LibreELEC (specialised media centre distribution) and specialised distributions for the Kodi media centre and classroom management. It promotes Python and Scratch as the main programming languages, with support for many other languages. The default firmware is closed source, while unofficial open source is available. Many other operating systems can also run on the Raspberry Pi. The formally verified microkernel seL4 is also supported. There are several ways of installing multiple operating systems on one SD card.
Other operating systems (not Linux- nor BSD-based)
 Broadcom VCOS – Proprietary operating system which includes an abstraction layer designed to integrate with existing kernels, such as ThreadX (which is used on the VideoCore4 processor), providing drivers and middleware for application development. In the case of the Raspberry Pi, this includes an application to start the ARM processor(s) and provide the publicly documented API over a mailbox interface, serving as its firmware. An incomplete source of a Linux port of VCOS is available as part of the reference graphics driver published by Broadcom.
 Haiku – an open source BeOS clone that has been compiled for the Raspberry Pi and several other ARM boards. Work on Pi 1 began in 2011, but only the Pi 2 will be supported.
 HelenOS – a portable microkernel-based multiserver operating system; has basic Raspberry Pi support since version 0.6.0
 Plan 9 from Bell Labs and Inferno (in beta)
 QNX
 RISC OS Pi (a special cut down version RISC OS Pico, for 16 MB cards and larger for all models of Pi 1 & 2, has also been made available.)
 Ultibo Core – OS-less unikerel Run Time Library based on Free Pascal. Lazarus IDE (Windows with 3rd party ports to Linux and MacOS). Most Pi models supported. 
 Windows 10 IoT Core – a zero-price edition of Windows 10 offered by Microsoft that runs natively on the Raspberry Pi 2.

Other operating systems (Linux-based)
 Alpine Linux – a Linux distribution based on musl and BusyBox, "designed for power users who appreciate security, simplicity and resource efficiency".
 Android Things – an embedded version of the Android operating system designed for IoT device development.
 Arch Linux ARM, a port of Arch Linux for ARM processors, and Arch-based Manjaro Linux ARM
 arkOS – designed for website and email self-hosting.
 CentOS for Raspberry Pi 2 and later
 Devuan
 emteria.OS – an embedded, managed version of the Android operating system for professional fleet management
 Fedora (supports Pi 2 and later since Fedora 25, Pi 1 is supported by some unofficial derivatives) and RedSleeve (a RHEL port) for Raspberry Pi 1
 Gentoo Linux
 Kali Linux – a Debian-derived distro designed for digital forensics and penetration testing.
 openSUSE, SUSE Linux Enterprise Server 12 SP2 and Server 12 SP3 (Commercial support)
 OpenWrt – a highly extensible Linux distribution for embedded devices (typically wireless routers). It supports Pi 1, 2, 3, 4 and Zero W.
 postmarketOS – distribution based on Alpine Linux, primarily developed for smartphones.
 RetroPie – an offshoot of Raspbian OS that uses Emulation Station as its frontend for RetroArch and other emulators like Mupen64 for retro gaming. Hardware like Freeplay tech can help replace Game boy internals with RetroPie emulation.
 Sailfish OS with Raspberry Pi 2 (due to use ARM Cortex-A7 CPU; Raspberry Pi 1 uses different ARMv6 architecture and Sailfish requires ARMv7.)
 Slackware ARM – version 13.37 and later runs on the Raspberry Pi without modification. The 128–496 MB of available memory on the Raspberry Pi is at least twice the minimum requirement of 64 MB needed to run Slackware Linux on an ARM or i386 system. (Whereas the majority of Linux systems boot into a graphical user interface, Slackware's default user environment is the textual shell / command line interface.) The Fluxbox window manager running under the X Window System requires an additional 48 MB of RAM.
 SolydXK – a light Debian-derived distro with Xfce.
 Tiny Core Linux – a minimal Linux operating system focused on providing a base system using BusyBox and FLTK. Designed to run primarily in RAM.
 Tizen - A Linux-based mobile operating system that was backed by the Linux Foundation and was mainly developed and primarily used by Samsung.
 Ubuntu-based: Lubuntu and Xubuntu
 Void Linux – a rolling release Linux distribution which was designed and implemented from scratch, provides images based on musl or glibc.
 webOS Open Source Edition - An open source version of webOS.
Other operating systems (BSD-based)
 FreeBSD
 NetBSD
 OpenBSD (only on 64-bit platforms, such as Raspberry Pi 3)

Driver APIs 

Raspberry Pi can use a VideoCore IV GPU via a binary blob, which is loaded into the GPU at boot time from the SD-card, and additional software, that initially was closed source. This part of the driver code was later released. However, much of the actual driver work is done using the closed source GPU code. Application software makes calls to closed source run-time libraries (OpenMax, OpenGL ES or OpenVG), which in turn call an open source driver inside the Linux kernel, which then calls the closed source VideoCore IV GPU driver code. The API of the kernel driver is specific for these closed libraries. Video applications use OpenMAX,  use OpenGL ES and  use OpenVG, which both in turn use EGL. OpenMAX and EGL use the open source kernel driver in turn.

Vulkan driver 
The Raspberry Pi Foundation first announced it was working on a Vulkan driver in February 2020. A working Vulkan driver running Quake 3 at 100 frames per second on a 3B+ was revealed by a graphics engineer who had been working on it as a hobby project on 20 June. On 24 November 2020 Raspberry Pi Foundation announced that their driver for the Raspberry Pi 4 is Vulkan 1.0 conformant. Raspberry Pi Trading announced further driver conformance for Vulkan 1.1 and 1.2 on 26 October 2021 and 1 August 2022.

Firmware 
The official firmware is a freely redistributable binary blob, that is proprietary software. A minimal proof-of-concept open source firmware is also available, mainly aimed at initialising and starting the ARM cores as well as performing minimal startup that is required on the ARM side. It is also capable of booting a very minimal Linux kernel, with patches to remove the dependency on the mailbox interface being responsive. It is known to work on Raspberry Pi 1, 2 and 3, as well as some variants of Raspberry Pi Zero.

Third-party application software 
 AstroPrint – AstroPrint's wireless 3D printing software can be run on the Pi 2.
 C/C++ Interpreter Ch – Released 3 January 2017, C/C++ interpreter Ch and Embedded Ch are released free for non-commercial use for Raspberry Pi, ChIDE is also included for the beginners to learn C/C++.
 Minecraft – Released 11 February 2013, a modified version that allows players to directly alter the world with computer code.
 RealVNC – Since 28 September 2016, Raspbian includes RealVNC's remote access server and viewer software. This includes a new capture technology which allows directly rendered content (e.g. Minecraft, camera preview and omxplayer) as well as non-X11 applications to be viewed and controlled remotely.
 UserGate Web Filter – On 20 September 2013, Florida-based security vendor Entensys announced porting UserGate Web Filter to Raspberry Pi platform.
 Steam Link – On 13 December 2018, Valve released official Steam Link game streaming client for the Raspberry Pi 3 and 3 B+.

Software development tools 
 Arduino IDE – for programming an Arduino.
 Algoid – for teaching programming to children and beginners.
 BlueJ – for teaching Java to beginners.
 Greenfoot – Greenfoot teaches object orientation with Java. Create 'actors' which live in 'worlds' to build games, simulations, and other graphical programs.
 Julia – an interactive and cross-platform programming language/environment, that runs on the Pi 1 and later. IDEs for Julia, such as Visual Studio Code, are available. See also Pi-specific GitHub repository JuliaBerry.
 Lazarus – a Free Pascal RAD IDE
 LiveCode – an educational RAD IDE descended from HyperCard using English-like language to write event-handlers for WYSIWYG widgets runnable on desktop, mobile and Raspberry Pi platforms.
 Ninja-IDE – a cross-platform integrated development environment (IDE) for Python.
 Processing – an IDE built for the electronic arts, new media art, and visual design communities with the purpose of teaching the fundamentals of computer programming in a visual context.
 Scratch – a cross-platform teaching IDE using visual blocks that stack like Lego, originally developed by MIT's Life Long Kindergarten group. The Pi version is very heavily optimised for the limited computer resources available and is implemented in the Squeak Smalltalk system. The latest version compatible with the 2B is 1.6.
 Squeak Smalltalk – a full-scale open Smalltalk.
 TensorFlow – an artificial intelligence framework developed by Google. The Raspberry Pi Foundation worked with Google to simplify the installation process through pre-built binaries.
 Thonny – a Python IDE for beginners.
 V-Play Game Engine – a cross-platform development framework that supports mobile game and app development with the V-Play Game Engine, V-Play apps, and V-Play plugins.

 Xojo – a cross-platform RAD tool that can create desktop, web and console apps for Pi 2 and Pi 3.
 C-STEM Studio – a platform for hands-on integrated learning of computing, science, technology, engineering, and mathematics (C-STEM) with robotics.
 Erlang – a functional language for building concurrent systems with light-weight processes and message passing.
 LabVIEW Community Edition – a system-design platform and development environment for a visual programming language from National Instruments.

Accessories 

 Gertboard – A Raspberry Pi Foundation sanctioned device, designed for educational purposes, that expands the Raspberry Pi's GPIO pins to allow interface with and control of LEDs, switches, analogue signals, sensors and other devices. It also includes an optional Arduino compatible controller to interface with the Pi.
 Camera – On 14 May 2013, the foundation and the distributors RS Components & Premier Farnell/Element 14 launched the Raspberry Pi camera board alongside a firmware update to accommodate it. The camera board is shipped with a flexible flat cable that plugs into the CSI connector which is located between the Ethernet and HDMI ports. In Raspbian, the user must enable the use of the camera board by running Raspi-config and selecting the camera option. The camera module costs €20 in Europe (9 September 2013). It uses the OmniVision OV5647 image sensor and can produce 1080p, 720p and 640x480p video. In May 2016, v2 of the camera was launched: it is an 8 megapixel camera using a Sony IMX219. In January 2023, v3 of the camera was launched: it is an 12 megapixel camera using a Sony IMX708.
 Infrared Camera – In October 2013, the foundation announced that they would begin producing a camera module without an infrared filter, called the Pi NoIR.
 Official Display – On 8 September 2015, The foundation and the distributors RS Components & Premier Farnell/Element 14 launched the Raspberry Pi Touch Display
 HAT (Hardware Attached on Top) expansion boardsTogether with the Model B+, inspired by the Arduino shield boards, the interface for HAT boards was devised by the Raspberry Pi Foundation. Each HAT board carries a small EEPROM (typically a CAT24C32WI-GT3) containing the relevant details of the board, so that the Raspberry Pi's OS is informed of the HAT, and the technical details of it, relevant to the OS using the HAT. Mechanical details of a HAT board, which uses the four mounting holes in their rectangular formation, are available online.
 High Quality Camera – In May 2020, the 12.3 megapixel Sony IMX477 Exmor sensor camera module was released with support for C- and CS-mount lenses. The unit initially retailed for US$50 with interchangeable lenses starting at US$25.

Vulnerability to flashes of light 
In February 2015, a switched-mode power supply chip, designated U16, of the Raspberry Pi 2 Model B version 1.1 (the initially released version) was found to be vulnerable to flashes of light, particularly the light from xenon camera flashes and green and red laser pointers. The U16 chip has WL-CSP packaging, which exposes the bare silicon die. The Raspberry Pi Foundation blog recommended covering U16 with opaque material (such as Sugru or Blu-Tak) or putting the Raspberry Pi 2 in a case. This issue was not discovered before the release of the Raspberry Pi 2 because it is not standard or common practice to test susceptibility to optical interference, while commercial electronic devices are routinely subjected to tests of susceptibility to radio interference.

Reception and use 

Technology writer Glyn Moody described the project in May 2011 as a "potential ", not by replacing  machines but by supplementing them. In March 2012 Stephen Pritchard echoed the BBC Micro successor sentiment in ITPRO. Alex Hope, co-author of the Next Gen report, is hopeful that the computer will engage children with the excitement of programming. Co-author Ian Livingstone suggested that the BBC could be involved in building support for the device, possibly branding it as the BBC Nano. The Centre for Computing History strongly supports the Raspberry Pi project, feeling that it could "usher in a new era". Before release, the board was showcased by ARM's CEO Warren East at an event in Cambridge outlining Google's ideas to improve UK science and technology education.

Harry Fairhead, however, suggests that more emphasis should be put on improving the educational software available on existing hardware, using tools such as Google App Inventor to return programming to schools, rather than adding new hardware choices. Simon Rockman, writing in a ZDNet blog, was of the opinion that teens will have "better things to do", despite what happened in the 1980s.

In October 2012, the Raspberry Pi won T3's Innovation of the Year award, and futurist Mark Pesce cited a (borrowed) Raspberry Pi as the inspiration for his ambient device project MooresCloud. In October 2012, the British Computer Society reacted to the announcement of enhanced specifications by stating, "it's definitely something we'll want to sink our teeth into."

In June 2017, Raspberry Pi won the Royal Academy of Engineering MacRobert Award. The citation for the award to the Raspberry Pi said it was "for its inexpensive credit card-sized microcomputers, which are redefining how people engage with computing, inspiring students to learn coding and computer science and providing innovative control solutions for industry."

Clusters of hundreds of Raspberry Pis have been used for testing programs destined for supercomputers.

Community 
The Raspberry Pi community was described by Jamie Ayre of FOSS software company AdaCore as one of the most exciting parts of the project. Community blogger Russell Davis said that the community strength allows the Foundation to concentrate on documentation and teaching. The community developed a fanzine around the platform called The MagPi which in 2015, was handed over to the Raspberry Pi Foundation by its volunteers to be continued in-house. A series of community Raspberry Jam events have been held across the UK and around the world.

Education 
, enquiries about the board in the United Kingdom have been received from schools in both the state and private sectors, with around five times as much interest from the latter. It is hoped that businesses will sponsor purchases for less advantaged schools. The CEO of Premier Farnell said that the government of a country in the Middle East has expressed interest in providing a board to every schoolgirl, to enhance her employment prospects.

In 2014, the Raspberry Pi Foundation hired a number of its community members including ex-teachers and software developers to launch a set of free learning resources for its website. The Foundation also started a teacher training course called Picademy with the aim of helping teachers prepare for teaching the new computing curriculum using the Raspberry Pi in the classroom.

In 2018, NASA launched the JPL Open Source Rover Project, which is a scaled down version of Curiosity rover and uses a Raspberry Pi as the control module, to encourage students and hobbyists to get involved in mechanical, software, electronics, and robotics engineering.

Home automation 
There are a number of developers and applications that are using the Raspberry Pi for home automation. These programmers are making an effort to modify the Raspberry Pi into a cost-affordable solution in energy monitoring and power consumption. Because of the relatively low cost of the Raspberry Pi, this has become a popular and economical alternative to the more expensive commercial solutions.

Industrial automation 
In June 2014, Polish industrial automation manufacturer TECHBASE released ModBerry, an industrial computer based on the Raspberry Pi Compute Module. The device has a number of interfaces, most notably RS-485/232 serial ports, digital and analogue inputs/outputs, CAN and economical 1-Wire buses, all of which are widely used in the automation industry. The design allows the use of the Compute Module in harsh industrial environments, leading to the conclusion that the Raspberry Pi is no longer limited to home and science projects, but can be widely used as an Industrial IoT solution and achieve goals of Industry 4.0.

In March 2018, SUSE announced commercial support for SUSE Linux Enterprise on the Raspberry Pi 3 Model B to support a number of undisclosed customers implementing industrial monitoring with the Raspberry Pi.

In January 2021, TECHBASE announced a Raspberry Pi Compute Module 4 cluster for AI accelerator, routing and file server use. The device contains one or more standard Raspberry Pi Compute Module 4s in an industrial DIN rail housing, with some versions containing one or more Coral Edge tensor processing units.

Commercial products 
The Organelle is a portable synthesizer, a sampler, a sequencer, and an effects processor designed and assembled by Critter & Guitari. It incorporates a Raspberry Pi computer module running Linux.

OTTO is a digital camera created by Next Thing Co. It incorporates a Raspberry Pi Compute Module. It was successfully crowd-funded in a May 2014 Kickstarter campaign.

Slice is a digital media player which also uses a Compute Module as its heart. It was crowd-funded in an August 2014 Kickstarter campaign. The software running on Slice is based on Kodi.

Numerous commercial thin client computer terminals use the Raspberry Pi.

AutoPi TMU device is a telematics unit which is built on top of a Raspberry Pi Compute Module 4 and incorporates the philosophy of which Raspberry Pi was built upon.

COVID-19 pandemic 
During the COVID-19 pandemic, demand increased primarily due to the increase in remote work, but also because of the use of many Raspberry Pi Zeros in ventilators for COVID-19 patients in countries such as Colombia, which were used to combat strain on the healthcare system. In March 2020, Raspberry Pi sales reached 640,000 units, the second largest month of sales in the company's history.

Astro Pi and Proxima 
A project was launched in December 2014 at an event held by the UK Space Agency. The Astro Pi was an augmented Raspberry Pi that included a sensor hat with a visible light or infrared camera. The Astro Pi competition, called Principia, was officially opened in January and was opened to all primary and secondary school aged children who were residents of the United Kingdom. During his mission, British ESA astronaut Tim Peake deployed the computers on board the International Space Station. He loaded the winning code while in orbit, collected the data generated and then sent this to Earth where it was distributed to the winning teams. Covered themes during the competition included spacecraft sensors, satellite imaging, space measurements, data fusion and space radiation.

The organisations involved in the Astro Pi competition include the UK Space Agency, UKspace, Raspberry Pi, ESERO-UK and ESA.

In 2017, the European Space Agency ran another competition open to all students in the European Union called Proxima. The winning programs were run on the ISS by Thomas Pesquet, a French astronaut. In December 2021, the Dragon 2 spacecraft launched by NASA had a pair of Astro Pi in it.

History 

The computer is inspired by Acorn's BBC Micro of 1981. The Model A, Model B and Model B+ names are references to the original models of the British educational BBC Micro computer, developed by Acorn Computers.

According to Upton, the name "Raspberry Pi" was chosen with "Raspberry" as an ode to a tradition of naming early computer companies after fruit, and "Pi" as a reference to the Python programming language.

In 2006, early concepts of the Raspberry Pi were based on the Atmel ATmega644 microcontroller. Its schematics and PCB layout are publicly available. Foundation trustee Eben Upton assembled a group of teachers, academics and computer enthusiasts to devise a computer to inspire children. 

The first ARM prototype version of the computer was mounted in a package the same size as a USB memory stick. It had a USB port on one end and an HDMI port on the other.

The Foundation's goal was to offer two versions, priced at US$25 and $35. They started accepting orders for the higher priced Model B on 29 February 2012, the lower cost Model A on 4 February 2013. and the even lower cost (US$20) A+ on 10 November 2014. On 26 November 2015, the cheapest Raspberry Pi yet, the Raspberry Pi Zero, was launched at US$5 or £4.

Pre-launch 
 
 August 2011 – 50 alpha boards are manufactured. These boards were functionally identical to the planned Model B, but they were physically larger to accommodate debug headers. Demonstrations of the board showed it running the LXDE desktop on Debian, Quake 3 at 1080p, and Full HD MPEG-4 video over HDMI.
 December 2011 – Twenty-five Model B Beta boards were assembled and tested from one hundred unpopulated PCBs. The component layout of the Beta boards was the same as on production boards. A single error was discovered in the board design where some pins on the CPU were not held high; it was fixed for the first production run. The Beta boards were demonstrated booting Linux, playing a 1080p movie trailer and the Rightware Samurai OpenGL ES benchmark.
 Early 2012 – During the first week of the year, the first 10 boards were put up for auction on eBay. One was bought anonymously and donated to the museum at The Centre for Computing History in Cambridge, England. The ten boards (with a total retail price of £220) together raised over £16,000, with the last to be auctioned, serial number No. 01, raising £3,500. In advance of the anticipated launch at the end of February 2012, the Foundation's servers struggled to cope with the load placed by watchers repeatedly refreshing their browsers.

Launch 
 19 February 2012 – The first proof of concept SD card image that could be loaded onto an SD card to produce a preliminary operating system is released. The image was based on Debian 6.0 (Squeeze), with the LXDE desktop and the Midori browser, plus various programming tools. The image also runs on QEMU allowing the Raspberry Pi to be emulated on various other platforms.
 29 February 2012 – Initial sales commence 29 February 2012 at 06:00 UTC;. At the same time, it was announced that the model A, originally to have had 128 MB of RAM, was to be upgraded to 256 MB before release. The Foundation's website also announced: "Six years after the project's inception, we're nearly at the end of our first run of development – although it's just the beginning of the Raspberry Pi story." The web-shops of the two licensed manufacturers selling Raspberry Pi's within the United Kingdom, Premier Farnell and RS Components, had their websites stalled by heavy web traffic immediately after the launch (RS Components briefly going down completely). Unconfirmed reports suggested that there were over two million expressions of interest or pre-orders. The official Raspberry Pi Twitter account reported that Premier Farnell sold out within a few minutes of the initial launch, while RS Components took over 100,000 pre orders on day one. Manufacturers were reported in March 2012 to be taking a "healthy number" of pre-orders.
 March 2012 – Shipping delays for the first batch were announced in March 2012, as the result of installation of an incorrect Ethernet port, but the Foundation expected that manufacturing quantities of future batches could be increased with little difficulty if required. "We have ensured we can get them [the Ethernet connectors with magnetics] in large numbers and Premier Farnell and RS Components [the two distributors] have been fantastic at helping to source components," Upton said. The first batch of 10,000 boards was manufactured in Taiwan and China.
 8 March 2012 – Release Raspberry Pi Fedora Remix, the recommended Linux distribution, developed at Seneca College in Canada.
 March 2012 – The Debian port is initiated by Mike Thompson, former CTO of Atomz. The effort was largely carried out by Thompson and Peter Green, a volunteer Debian developer, with some support from the Foundation, who tested the resulting binaries that the two produced during the early stages (neither Thompson nor Green had physical access to the hardware, as boards were not widely accessible at the time due to demand). While the preliminary proof of concept image distributed by the Foundation before launch was also Debian-based, it differed from Thompson and Green's Raspbian effort in a couple of ways. The POC image was based on then-stable Debian Squeeze, while Raspbian aimed to track then-upcoming Debian Wheezy packages. Aside from the updated packages that would come with the new release, Wheezy was also set to introduce the armhf architecture, which became the raison d'être for the Raspbian effort. The Squeeze-based POC image was limited to the armel architecture, which was, at the time of Squeeze's release, the latest attempt by the Debian project to have Debian run on the newest ARM embedded-application binary interface (EABI). The armhf architecture in Wheezy intended to make Debian run on the ARM VFP hardware floating-point unit, while armel was limited to emulating floating point operations in software. Since the Raspberry Pi included a VFP, being able to make use of the hardware unit would result in performance gains and reduced power use for floating point operations. The armhf effort in mainline Debian, however, was orthogonal to the work surrounding the Pi and only intended to allow Debian to run on ARMv7 at a minimum, which would mean the Pi, an ARMv6 device, would not benefit. As a result, Thompson and Green set out to build the 19,000 Debian packages for the device using a custom build cluster.

Post-launch 
 16 April 2012 – Reports appear from the first buyers who had received their Raspberry Pi.
 20 April 2012 – The schematics for the Model A and Model B are released.
 18 May 2012 – The Foundation reported on its blog about a prototype camera module they had tested. The prototype used a  module.
 22 May 2012 – Over 20,000 units had been shipped.
 July 2012 – Release of Raspbian.
 16 July 2012 – It was announced that 4,000 units were being manufactured per day, allowing Raspberry Pis to be bought in bulk.
 24 August 2012 – Hardware accelerated video (H.264) encoding becomes available after it became known that the existing licence also covered encoding. Formerly it was thought that encoding would be added with the release of the announced camera module. However, no stable software exists for hardware H.264 encoding. At the same time the Foundation released two additional codecs that can be bought separately, MPEG-2 and Microsoft's VC-1. Also it was announced that the Pi will implement CEC, enabling it to be controlled with the television's remote control.
 5 September 2012 – The Foundation announced a second revision of the Raspberry Pi Model B. A revision 2.0 board is announced, with a number of minor corrections and improvements.
 6 September 2012 – Announcement that in future the bulk of Raspberry Pi units would be manufactured in the UK, at Sony's manufacturing facility in Pencoed, Wales. The Foundation estimated that the plant would produce 30,000 units per month, and would create about 30 new jobs.
 15 October 2012 – It is announced that new Raspberry Pi Model Bs are to be fitted with 512 MB instead of 256 MB RAM.
 24 October 2012 – The Foundation announces that "all of the VideoCore driver code which runs on the ARM" had been released as free software under a BSD-style licence, making it "the first ARM-based multimedia SoC with functional, vendor-provided (as opposed to partial, reverse engineered) fully open-source drivers", although this claim has not been universally accepted. On 28 February 2014, they also announced the release of full documentation for the VideoCore IV graphics core, and a complete source release of the graphics stack under a 3-clause BSD licence
 October 2012 – It was reported that some customers of one of the two main distributors had been waiting more than six months for their orders. This was reported to be due to difficulties in sourcing the CPU and conservative sales forecasting by this distributor.
 17 December 2012 – The Foundation, in collaboration with IndieCity and Velocix, opens the Pi Store, as a "one-stop shop for all your Raspberry Pi (software) needs". Using an application included in Raspbian, users can browse through several categories and download what they want. Software can also be uploaded for moderation and release.
 3 June 2013 – "New Out of Box Software" or NOOBS is introduced. This makes the Raspberry Pi easier to use by simplifying the installation of an operating system. Instead of using specific software to prepare an SD card, a file is unzipped and the contents copied over to a FAT formatted (4 GB or bigger) SD card. That card can then be booted on the Raspberry Pi and a choice of six operating systems is presented for installation on the card. The system also contains a recovery partition that allows for the quick restoration of the installed OS, tools to modify the config.txt and an online help button and web browser which directs to the Raspberry Pi Forums.
 October 2013 – The Foundation announces that the one millionth Pi had been manufactured in the United Kingdom.
 November 2013: they announce that the two millionth Pi shipped between 24 and 31 October.
 28 February 2014 – On the day of the second anniversary of the Raspberry Pi, Broadcom, together with the Raspberry Pi foundation, announced the release of full documentation for the VideoCore IV graphics core, and a complete source release of the graphics stack under a 3-clause BSD licence.

 7 April 2014 – The official Raspberry Pi blog announced the Raspberry Pi Compute Module, a device in a 200-pin DDR2 SO-DIMM-configured memory module (though not in any way compatible with such RAM), intended for consumer electronics designers to use as the core of their own products.
 June 2014 – The official Raspberry Pi blog mentioned that the three millionth Pi shipped in early May 2014.
 14 July 2014 – The official Raspberry Pi blog announced the Raspberry Pi Model B+, "the final evolution of the original Raspberry Pi. For the same price as the original Raspberry Pi model B, but incorporating numerous small improvements people have been asking for".
 10 November 2014 – The official Raspberry Pi blog announced the Raspberry Pi Model A+. It is the smallest and cheapest (US$20) Raspberry Pi so far and has the same processor and RAM as the Model A. Like the A, it has no Ethernet port, and only one USB port, but does have the other innovations of the B+, like lower power, micro-SD-card slot, and 40-pin HAT compatible GPIO.
 2 February 2015 – The official Raspberry Pi blog announced the Raspberry Pi 2. Looking like a Model B+, it has a 900 MHz quad-core ARMv7 Cortex-A7 CPU, twice the memory (for a total of 1 GB) and complete compatibility with the original generation of Raspberry Pis.
 14 May 2015 – The price of Model B+ was decreased from US$35 to $25, purportedly as a "side effect of the production optimizations" from the Pi 2 development. Industry observers have sceptically noted, however, that the price drop appeared to be a direct response to the CHIP, a lower-priced competitor discontinued in April 2017.
 29 September 2015 – A new version of the Raspbian operating system, based on Debian Jessie, is released.
 26 November 2015 – The Raspberry Pi Foundation launched the Raspberry Pi Zero, the smallest and cheapest member of the Raspberry Pi family yet, at 65 mm × 30 mm, and US$5. The Zero is similar to the Model A+ without camera and LCD connectors, while smaller and uses less power. It was given away with the Raspberry Pi magazine Magpi No. 40 that was distributed in the UK and US that day the MagPi was sold out at almost every retailer internationally due to the freebie.
 29 February 2016 – Raspberry Pi 3 with a BCM2837 1.2 GHz 64-bit quad processor based on the ARMv8 Cortex-A53, with built-in Wi-Fi BCM43438 802.11n 2.4 GHz and Bluetooth 4.1 Low Energy (BLE). Starting with a 32-bit Raspbian version, with a 64-bit version later to come if "there is value in moving to 64-bit mode". In the same announcement it was said that a new BCM2837 based Compute Module was expected to be introduced a few months later.
 February 2016 – The Raspberry Pi Foundation announces that they had sold eight million devices (for all models combined), making it the best-selling UK personal computer, ahead of the Amstrad PCW. Sales reached ten million in September 2016.
 25 April 2016 – Raspberry Pi Camera v2.1 announced with 8 Mpixels, in normal and NoIR (can receive IR) versions. To make use of the new resolution the software has to be updated.
 10 October 2016 – NEC Display Solutions announces that select models of commercial displays to be released in early 2017 will incorporate a Raspberry Pi 3 Compute Module.
 14 October 2016 – Raspberry Pi Foundation announces their co-operation with NEC Display Solutions. They expect that the Raspberry Pi 3 Compute Module will be available to the general public by the end of 2016.
 25 November 2016 – 11 million units sold.
 16 January 2017 – Compute Module 3 and Compute Module 3 Lite are launched.
 28 February 2017 – Raspberry Pi Zero W with WiFi and Bluetooth via chip scale antennas launched.
 17 August 2017 – The Raspbian operating system is upgraded to a new version, based on Debian Stretch.
 14 March 2018 – On Pi Day, Raspberry Pi Foundation introduced Raspberry Pi 3 Model B+ with improvements in the Raspberry PI 3B computers performance, updated version of the Broadcom application processor, better wireless Wi-Fi and Bluetooth performance and addition of the 5 GHz band.
 15 November 2018 – Raspberry Pi 3 Model A+ launched.
 28 January 2019 – Compute Module 3+ (CM3+/Lite, CM3+/8 GB, CM3+/16 GB and CM3+/32 GB) launched.
 24 June 2019 – Raspberry Pi 4 Model B launched, along with a new version of the Raspbian operating system based on Debian Buster.
 10 December 2019 – 30 million units sold; sales are about 6 million per year.
 28 May 2020 – An 8GB version of the Raspberry Pi 4 is announced for $75. Raspberry Pi OS is split off from Raspbian, and now includes a beta of a 64-bit version that allows programs to use more than 4GB of RAM.
 19 October 2020 – Compute Module 4 launched.
 2 November 2020 – Raspberry Pi 400 launched. It is a keyboard which incorporates Raspberry Pi 4 into it. GPIO pins of the Raspberry Pi 4 are accessible.
 21 January 2021 – Raspberry Pi Pico launched. It is the first microcontroller-class product from Raspberry Pi. It is based on RP2040 Microcontroller developed by Raspberry Pi.
 11 May 2021 – 40 million units sold.
 21 September 2021 – 42 million units sold.
 30 October 2021 – Raspberry Pi OS (formerly Raspbian) is updated version 11, based on Debian Bullseye. With this release, the default clock speed for revision 1.4 of the Raspberry Pi 4 is increased to 1.8 GHz.
 16 November 2021 – 43 million units sold.
 28 February 2022, exactly 10 years after the first shipment, 46 million units sold.

Sales 
According to the Raspberry Pi Foundation, more than 5 million Raspberry Pis were sold by February 2015, making it the best-selling British computer. By November 2016 they had sold 11 million units, and 12.5 million by March 2017, making it the third best-selling "general purpose computer". In July 2017, sales reached nearly 15 million, climbing to 19 million in March 2018. By December 2019, a total of 30 million devices had been sold.

Supply difficulties 
In 2021 and continuing through 2022, there are significant availability issues and Raspberry Pi products are difficult to obtain.  The company explained its approach to the shortages in 2021
 and April 2022, explaining that it was prioritising business and industrial customers; however major distributors are showing lead times in excess of 12 months on all products.

The situation is sufficiently long term that at least one automated stock checker is online.

See also 

 Single-board computer
 Plug computer

References

Further reading 
 Raspberry Pi For Dummies; Sean McManus and Mike Cook; 2013; .
 Getting Started with Raspberry Pi; Matt Richardson and Shawn Wallace; 2013; .
 Raspberry Pi User Guide; Eben Upton and Gareth Halfacree; 2014; .
 Hello Raspberry Pi!; Ryan Heitz; 2016; .

External links 

 
 Raspberry Pi, Department of Computer Science and Technology, University of Cambridge
 Raspberry Pi Wiki, supported by the RPF
 The MagPi Magazine
 "Raspberry Pi pinout" board GPIO pinout
 "Raspberry Pi component map" 
 "RaspberryPi Boards: Hardware versions/revisions"
 ARM1176JZF-S (ARM11 CPU Core) Technical Reference Manual , ARM Ltd.

 
2012 establishments in the United Kingdom
British brands
Computers designed in the United Kingdom
British inventions
Computer science education in the United Kingdom
Educational hardware
Linux-based devices
Products introduced in 2012